Paul Bonga Bonga (born 25 April 1933) is a Congolese footballer of the 1950s and 1960s. A midfielder, he rose to prominence during his time in Belgium at Standard Liège and was perhaps best remembered as the first African footballer to be selected in the World Soccer Magazine world XI, when he was chosen in 1962.

Career
Bonga was born in Ebonda. He started playing football barefoot, in 1948 for the Golden Lion and then for Sporting, St. Anne College team. In 1950, he joined Union and put on his first boots. He was transferred in 1952 to Daring Club Motema Pembe. In 1956, while on a European tour, he was noticed by sports journalists, particularly for his match against the Standard Liège. In late 1957 he was invited to Standard, and became Belgian champion in the seasons of 1958–1960.

In 1960, Bonga Bonga finished as runner-up to Paul Van Himst in voting for the Soulier d'Or, the Belgian Golden Shoe. It was the only occasion in the first twenty years of the award that a non-Belgian player finished in the top three players of the year.

In 1962, Bonga Bonga became the first non-naturalised African player to feature in the semi-final of the European Cup.

After playing for more than 10 years in Belgian clubs, Bonga retired in 1970 and became a coach at FC Tubize. After returning home in 1972, Bonga led Daring Club Motema Pembe before assuming the post of President Sportif. In 1991, he was appointed National Technical Director of the Leopards (present-day Simba).

Timeline
1948 – 1951 : Lion d'or, puis Sporting Club
1952 – 1954 : Union
1954 – 1957 : Daring Club Motema Pembe
1956: Médaille d'or de l'association "Royale Sportive Congolaise"
1957 – 1963 : Standard de Liège (Belgique)
1961: Plaquette + prix de l'effort Sportif de la ville de Liège
1962:
Médaille d'or trophée Pappaert (Journal les sports de Bruxelles)
Médaille de bronze du Ministère de la santé et de la famille de Liège
Soulier d'argent (2ème meilleur joueur Européen)
1963 – 1967 : Sporting de Charleroi
1968 – 1970: Moteur breveté/Ecole des entraïneur à Heysel 1972 – 1973 : Entraîneur DCMP
1976: Médaille d'or / mérite sportif Congolais
1981: Président du DCMP
1984 – 1991: Directeur Technique National et Membre de la Fecofa

See also
Léon Mokuna

References

1933 births
Living people
People from Mongala
Belgian Congo people
Association football midfielders
Democratic Republic of the Congo footballers
Democratic Republic of the Congo expatriate footballers
Daring Club Motema Pembe players
Standard Liège players
R. Charleroi S.C. players
Belgian Pro League players
Expatriate footballers in Belgium
Democratic Republic of the Congo expatriate sportspeople in Belgium
Democratic Republic of the Congo football managers
Democratic Republic of the Congo national football team managers